Ramage Point is an ice-covered point lying just west of Beakley Glacier on the north side of Carney Island, along the coast of Marie Byrd Land. Delineated from aerial photographs taken by U.S. Navy Operation Highjump in January 1947. Named by Advisory Committee on Antarctic Names (US-ACAN) for R. Admiral L.P. Ramage, U.S. Navy, Asst. Chief of Naval Operations, Ships Operations and Readiness, in the post 1957-58 IGY period.

Headlands of Marie Byrd Land